Miranda Mellis is the author of Demystifications, The Spokes, None of This Is Real, and The Revisionist. Her fiction, reviews, and essays have appeared in various publications including The Believer's The Logger, Harper’s, Conjunctions, the New York Times, Fence and elsewhere. She has received a grant from the National Endowment for the Humanities and the John Hawkes Prize in Fiction, and has been an Artist in Residence at the Headlands Center for the Arts and the Millay Colony. She co-founded and co-edited The Encyclopedia Project and once played in a band called My Invisible. She teaches at  Evergreen State College. She has taught in the MFA programs at California College of the Arts, Mills College, and University of San Francisco and has taught undergraduates at University of Chicago, University of California at Santa Cruz, and Brown University.

Bibliography
 The Revisionist (2007)
 Materialisms (2009)
 None of This Is Real (2012)
 The Spokes (2012)
 The Quarry (2013)
 The Instead (2016)
 Demystifications (2021)
 The Revolutionary (2022)

References

Living people
American women novelists
Naropa University alumni
Brown University alumni
Evergreen State College faculty
Year of birth missing (living people)
Novelists from Washington (state)
American women academics
21st-century American women